Bodega Bay is a village and census-designated place (CDP) in Sonoma County, California, United States. The population was 912 at the 2020 census. The town, located along State Route 1, is on the eastern side of Bodega Harbor, an inlet of Bodega Bay on the Pacific coast.

History

Bodega Bay is the site of the first Russian structures built in California, which were erected in 1809 by Commerce Counseller Ivan Alexandrovich Kuskov of the Russian-American Company in the lead-up to the establishment of Fort Ross.  The Russians named the settlement in Bodega Bay Port Rumyantsev after the Russian Foreign Minister Nikolai Petrovich Rumyantsev, and it served as a port to support Fort Ross and the larger Russian community known as Colony Ross.

The town is now named in honor of Juan Francisco de la Bodega y Quadra, a Spanish naval officer who explored the west coast of North America as far north as Alaska during multiple voyages of discovery in the late 18th century.

The location scenes in the Alfred Hitchcock-directed film The Birds (1963) were filmed in both Bodega Bay and nearby Bodega (though both were represented as being parts of the film's Bodega Bay.) The town markets itself by using the film in many ways, including its Birds-themed visitors' center although none of the film's primary locations is found there. The church and the schoolhouse shown in the film are on the Bodega Highway in Bodega.
The town also featured in the cult horror film Puppet Master (1989).

The Pacific Gas and Electric Company G&E) wanted to build a nuclear power plant on Bodega Head in the 1960s, but the plans were shut down after a large protest (the first for environmental reasons) and the geologic fault which was found while it was digging the hole for the first reactor. The hole filled with water and became known as "The Hole in the Head".

Government

Education
Shoreline Unified School District operates the Bodega Bay School.

The district's high school is Tomales High School.

Geography

The town lies on the edge of Bodega Harbor. Bodega Bay itself extends south along the coast to Tomales Bay. North of town lies a long coastal exposure of alternating rock outcrops and sandy beaches which is known as Sonoma Coast State Beach.

The U.S. National Weather Service provides a helpful visual aid graphing weather and climate information from the nearby Monterey sensors to display visually by month the annual typical temperatures, the past year's temperatures, and record temperatures.

Climate
This region experiences warm (but not hot) and dry summers, with no average monthly temperatures above .  According to the Köppen Climate Classification system, Bodega Bay has a warm-summer Mediterranean climate, abbreviated "Csb" on climate maps. Like much of the California coast, summer afternoons are often cool and windy (and sometimes foggy) as winds blow in off the ocean.

Demographics

2010 Census data
The 2010 United States Census reported that Bodega Bay had a population of 1,077. The ethnic makeup of Bodega Bay was 951 (88.3%) White, 2 (0.2%) African American, 4 (0.4%) Native American, 33 (3.1%) Asian, 4 (0.4%) Pacific Islander, 49 (4.5%) from other races, and 34 (3.2%) from two or more races. Hispanic or Latino of any race were 126 persons (11.7%).

The Census reported that 99.0% of the population lived in households and 1.0% lived in non-institutionalized group quarters.

There were 533 households, out of which 77 (14.4%) had children under the age of 18 living in them, 278 (52.2%) were opposite-sex married couples living together, 22 (4.1%) had a female householder with no husband present, 14 (2.6%) had a male householder with no wife present.  There were 33 (6.2%) unmarried opposite-sex partnerships, and 8 (1.5%) same-sex married couples or partnerships. 170 households (31.9%) were made up of individuals, and 67 (12.6%) had someone living alone who was 65 years of age or older. The average household size was 2.00.  There were 314 families (58.9% of all households); the average family size was 2.48.

The population was spread out, with 131 people (12.2%) under the age of 18, 52 people (4.8%) aged 18 to 24, 172 people (16.0%) aged 25 to 44, 409 people (38.0%) aged 45 to 64, and 313 people (29.1%) who were 65 years of age or older.  The median age was 57.2 years. For every 100 females, there were 105.9 males.  For every 100 females age 18 and over, there were 106.1 males.

The homeowner vacancy rate was 4.6%; the rental vacancy rate was 23.7%. 65.3% of the population lived in owner-occupied housing units and 33.7% lived in rental housing units.

2000 Census data
As of the census of 2000, there were 1,423 people, 669 households, and 432 families residing in the CDP. The racial makeup of the CDP was 85.52% White, 0.35% African American, 1.55% Native American, 1.34% Asian, 9.07% from other races, and 2.18% from two or more races. Hispanic or Latino of any race were 15.18% of the population. There were 669 households, out of which 14.5% had children under the age of 18 living with them, 57.5% were married couples living together, 3.9% had a female householder with no husband present, and 35.4% were non-families. 27.2% of all households were made up of individuals, and 9.1% had someone living alone who was 65 years of age or older. The average household size was 2.11 and the average family size was 2.47.

In the CDP, the population was 12.7% under the age of 18, 6.2% from 18 to 24, 21.7% from 25 to 44, 36.5% from 45 to 64, and 22.8% who were 65 years of age or older.  The median age was 51 years. For every 100 females, there were 108.0 males.  For every 100 females age 18 and over, there were 106.3 males. The median income for a household in the CDP was $56,818, and the median income for a family was $60,750. Males had a median income of $27,778 versus $28,375 for females. The per capita income for the CDP was $37,226.  About 2.0% of families and 4.0% of the population were below the poverty line. This includes none of those under the age of eighteen or sixty-five or over.

Notable people

Bodega Bay was the hometown of Nicholas Green, the American child shot dead during a robbery by highwaymen in Italy where his family were on vacation in 1994. Nicholas and his family became famous when almost every organ or body part was donated to those in need following his death.

Erden Eruç made history here when he completed the first entirely solo and entirely human-powered circumnavigation of the Earth. He began the expedition on July 10, 2007 in Bodega Bay and returned a little more than five years later on July 21, 2012.

Film locations 
Bodega Bay has served as a location for several major films and TV shows:

 The Birds (1963): Except for a short sequence at the beginning filmed in San Francisco, most of the film's exterior scenes were filmed around the two towns of Bodega (a small inland village) and Bodega Bay (a larger village on the bay). Special sites used for shooting included Potter School, the Bay, the two towns which were made to appear as one, and the home and barn across the bay from the town of Bodega Bay.
 The Russians Are Coming, the Russians Are Coming (1966) Some scenes filmed in Bodega Bay.
 The Pack (1977): Filmed around Bodega Bay.
 The Fog (1980)
 The Goonies (1985): The ending was shot at Goat Rock Beach.
 Puppet Master (1989): Setting is Bodega Bay for the first two, fourth and fifth films.
 Sleepwalkers (1992): Opening scene filmed in Bodega Bay.
 Hart to Hart: Home Is Where the Hart Is (1994 TV movie): Exterior scenes of the town.
 I Know What You Did Last Summer (1997): Scenes around the road accident.
 Road Trip with Huell Howser Episode 117 (2002)
 It's Always Sunny in Philadelphia (2021): Season 15's multi-episode arc was originally going to be filmed in Ireland. But due to COVID-19 restrictions, Bodega Bay was used as the stand-in for those episodes.

Other facilities
A branch of the University of California operates a marine lab at Bodega Bay, the Bodega Marine Laboratory.

A nuclear power plant had been planned for Bodega Bay in the 1960s but was abandoned after both local and statewide protests and the discovery of the San Andreas fault near the proposed site. Excavation for the site began at Bodega Head, and since the project was abandoned the area has been referred to by locals as "The Hole in the Head."

See also
Bodega Bay Nuclear Power Plant
Anti-nuclear movement in California

References

External links

 Bodega Bay Chamber of Commerce

 
Census-designated places in California
Census-designated places in Sonoma County, California
Populated coastal places in California